Specially designed academic instruction in English (SDAIE) is a teaching approach intended for teaching various academic content (such as social studies, science or literature) using the English language to students who are still learning English. SDAIE requires the student possess intermediate fluency in English as well as mastery of their native language. The instruction is carefully prepared so the student can access the English language content supported by material in their primary language and carefully planned instruction that strives for comprehensible input. SDAIE is a method of teaching students in English in such a manner that they gain skills in both the subject material and in using English.

SDAIE is not an English-only submersion program where the student is dependent solely on English, nor is it a watered down curriculum. SDAIE is an approach that seeks to teach both content and language in a cognitively demanding environment. As such, it is an important aspect of some structured English immersion programs. Lessons thus include both content goals and language goals for the students.

Preparing good lessons in SDAIE require awareness that the student is not a native English speaker and avoidance of those aspects of English that might make it difficult for a person learning English as a second language. This includes avoiding idiomatic English, which may seem natural to a native speaker but would confuse non-native speakers.

Features of SDAIE
Low affective filter
 Error correction done in context through teacher modeling
 New teaching material introduced and presented by the teacher in a way that engages the student.

Modified speech
 slower speech rate
 clear enunciation
 controlled vocabulary
 use of cognates
 limited use of idiomatic speech
 words with double meaning defined

Contextual clues
 gestures and facial expressions
 meaning acted out
 color-coded materials/ graphic organizers

Multisensory experiences
 realia, props and manipulatives
 audio-visual materials
 hands on activities and demonstrations
 overhead transparencies and similar projection technologies

Comprehensible input
 graphic organizers (maps, charts, graphs)
 word banks with picture clue
 bulletin boards
 explanation of word origins (etymology)
 use of examples and analogies

Frequent Comprehension checks
 questions asked about details
 eliciting responses through various modalities (write on white boards, thumbs up/down, etc.)

Formative assessment
 confirmation checks
 clarification requests
 repetitions
 expansions
 variety of question types
 interaction: teacher: student student:teacher student: student group

Summative assessment
 mastery assessed using a variety of modalities
 review of main topics and key vocabulary
 resulting product shows mastery of key concepts and synthesis of information
 written assessment appropriate for intermediate/ early advanced English language learners

Appropriate lesson design
 student fluency level is reflected
 evidence of scaffolding
 listening and speaking activities precede reading and writing activities
 reading assignments include prereading, during reading, postreading activities
 writing activities preceded by pre-writing
 vocabulary emphasis
 use of cooperative learning groups
 tapping prior knowledge/ personal application
 appropriate pacing
 modeling of activities
 specific learning strategies or study skills are taught and modeled
 evidence of text adaptation
 emphasis on higher order critical thinking skills
 provision of native language support
 extension/ debriefing activity included

Content-driven
 rigorous core curriculum (not 'watered down')
 key topics organized around main themes
 topics appropriate to grade level

Relevant articles
Genzuk, M. (2011). Specially Designed Academic Instruction in English (SDAIE) for Language Minority Students
Education
Teaching English as a Foreign Language

External links
Teacher's resources

English language